Dear Miss Doctor is a 1954 West German romantic comedy film directed by Hans H. König and starring Edith Mill, Hans Nielsen and Helmut Schmid.

It was shot at the Bavaria Studios in Munich. The film's sets were designed by the art directors Hertha Hareiter and Otto Pischinger.

Synopsis
The Students at a boarding school write a series of love letters between their attractive female teacher and one of the male sports teachers. This leads to confusion and embarrassment before the two realize that they are truly in love.

Cast
 Edith Mill as Dr. Maria Hofer
 Hans Nielsen as Direktor Dr. Franke
 Helmut Schmid as Dr. Hans Klinger
 Robert Freitag as Pater Anselmus
 Hans Clarin as Cicero, Klassenprimus
 Lina Carstens as Oberin des Klosters
 Gusti Kreissl as Luise Franke
 Wastl Witt as Pedell Korbinian
 Hermann Pfeiffer as Mathematikprofessor
 Arnulf Schröder
 Michael Rabanus as Sprachlehrer
 Alex Weber as Zeichenlehrer
 Karl Schaidler as Lehrer
 Petra Unkel as Friseuse
 Hanna Wördy as Dienstmädchen
 Axel Arens
 Christian Doermer
 Dan Calinescu
 Michael Eder
 Dieter Kunheim
 Herbert Lauterbach
 Günther Lynen
 Moritz Milar
 Ali Pery
 Franz Simon
 Peter Tost
 Fred Staal

References

Bibliography
 Bock, Hans-Michael & Bergfelder, Tim. The Concise CineGraph. Encyclopedia of German Cinema. Berghahn Books, 2009.

External links 
 

1954 films
1954 romantic comedy films
German romantic comedy films
West German films
1950s German-language films
Films directed by Hans H. König
Films set in boarding schools
Films shot at Bavaria Studios
German black-and-white films
1950s German films